The following is a list of active theatres and concert halls in Wales.  They are organised alphabetically in name order.

Note that in rural areas, church halls and town halls may double up as theatres, and that many colleges and universities also have their own auditoria.

Welsh and English names are listed according to their descriptor.

A
Aberystwyth Arts Centre
Adelina Patti Theatre, Craig-y-Nos Castle near Swansea
 The Albert Hall, Llandrindod Wells

B
Beaufort Theatre, Blaenau Gwent
Borough Theatre, Abergavenny
Brangwyn Hall, Swansea
Theatr Brycheiniog, Brecon

C
Caerleon amphitheatre, a ruined Roman venue
Canolfan Soar, Merthyr Tydfil
Capitol Theatre, Cardiff
Cardiff Empire
Carmarthen Public Rooms
Chapter Arts Centre, Cardiff
Coliseum Theatre, Aberdare
Congress Theatre, Torfaen

D
Dirty Protest Theatre
Dolman Theatre, Newport
Dylan Thomas Theatre, Swansea

F
Theatr Felinfach, Ystrad Aeron near Lampeter

G
The Gate Arts Centre, Cardiff
Grand Pavilion, Porthcawl
Grand Theatre, Swansea
Theatr Gwaun, Fishguard

H
Halliwell Theatre, Carmarthen
Theatr Hafren, Newtown, Powys

L
The Little Theatre, Tredegar
Llandudno Pier Pavilion Theatre
Lyric Theatre, Carmarthen
The Little Theatre Rhyl

N
New Theatre, Cardiff

P
Parc and Dare Hall, Treorchy
Patti Pavilion, Swansea
The Princess Royal Theatre, Port Talbot
The Point, Cardiff

Q
Queens Hall, Narberth

R
Riverfront Arts Centre, Newport

S
Savoy Theatre, Monmouth
Sherman Cymru, Cardiff
St David's Hall, Cardiff

T
The Tabernacle, Machynlleth
Taliesin Arts Centre, Swansea
Theatr Clwyd, Mold, Flintshire
Torch Theatre, Milford Haven
Townhill Theatre, Swansea

V
Venue Cymru, Llandudno

W
Wales Millennium Centre, Cardiff
Willow Globe Theatre, Powys

See also
Theatre of Wales

!

Wales
Theatres